No-fault may refer to:

No-fault divorce
No-fault insurance
No-fault liability also known as strict liability